Legend of the Bat, also known as Bat Island Adventure or Clans of Intrigue 2, is a 1978 Hong Kong wuxia film adapted from Bianfu Chuanqi of Gu Long's Chu Liuxiang novel series. The film was directed and written by Chor Yuen, produced by the Shaw Brothers Studio, and starred Ti Lung as the lead character. It was preceded by Clans of Intrigue (1977) and followed by Perils of the Sentimental Swordsman (1982).

Plot
Chu Liuxiang and Zhongyuan Yidianhong pass by a shipwreck and meet Master Kumei. They also discover that a group of highly skilled pugilists have been murdered at a gathering in Siming Mountain Manor. The only survivor is a man called Yuan Suifeng, who has become insane after being severely injured. They hear of Bat Island, a mysterious place where anyone can buy anything he desires, as long as he has money. Chu and his friends travel to the island to seek answers. However, they are not the only ones going there: Li Yuhan and his wife, Liu Wuming, are there in search of an extraordinary drug; Jin Lingzhi is there to find her father; a group of imperial guards are there to arrest the Bat Prince.

Cast
Ti Lung as Chu Liuxiang
Ling Yun as Zhongyuan Yidianhong
Derek Yee as Bat Prince Yuan Suiyun
Yueh Hua as Li Yuhan
Ching Li as Liu Wuming
Wong Chung as Gou Zichang
Candice Yu as Jin Lingzhi
Tony Liu as Yuan Suifeng
Chan Si-gai as Li Hongxiu
Chong Lee as Song Tian'er
Norman Chui as Xiang Feitian
Wang Lai as Master Kumei
Lau Wai-ling as Gao Yanan
Ku Kuan-chung as Ding Feng
Cheng Miu as Priest Tieshan
Ngai Fei as Long Wu
 as Gongsun Jieming
Tang Tak-cheung as Monk Wugen
Yuen Wah
Lam Ching-ying
Yuen Bun
Shum Lo
Alan Chui Chung-San
Wong Pau-gei
Chan Shen
Keung Hon
Wang Han-chen
Lo Wai
Chung Fat
Tam Bo
Lee Hang
Yuen Yat-choh
Chui Fat
Yuen Shun-yee
Wong Chi-keung
Wan Fat
Ng Yuen-fan
Fong Yue

External links

1978 films
1978 martial arts films
Hong Kong martial arts films
Hong Kong action thriller films
Wuxia films
1970s action thriller films
1970s martial arts films
1970s mystery films
Shaw Brothers Studio films
Works based on Chu Liuxiang (novel series)
Films directed by Chor Yuen
Films based on works by Gu Long
1970s Hong Kong films